Balvi is a town in Balvi Municipality in the Latgale region of Latvia. It was the administrative seat of the region (Latvian: rajons) of the same name since 1949; prior to the occupation of Latvia it was part of the Abrene district. The name derives from the stream Bolupīte and the adjacent lake.

The first mention of Balvi was in 1224. A small wooden church and manor were constructed on the estate of a Polish noblewoman Konstancija Hilsena at the site ca. 1765. In 1806 it passed to the Horozhinsky family and in 1876 the estate was purchased by the Baltic German Transehe-Roseneck family. The village was separated from the estate in 1915, and Balvi received town rights in 1928.

Most of the town's Jews (around 21% of the population) perished in the Stahlecker phase of the Holocaust in August 1941. The retreating Germans set fire to Balvi in July 1944, and the town was rebuilt according to Soviet plans from 1945. Balvi was a center of the Singing Revolution and is vital to Latgalian culture today. The town library in particular is the focus of many cultural events.

Demographics of Balvi

References

Towns in Latvia
1928 establishments in Latvia
Populated places established in 1928
Holocaust locations in Latvia
Balvi Municipality
Lyutsinsky Uyezd
Latgale